The Caudron G.2 was a single-engined French biplane built by Caudron, used in World War I as a reconnaissance aircraft and trainer.

Development
The outbreak of World War I precipitated the need for military applications of the successful Caudron Type G, leading to the creation of the G.2. The Caudron G.2 had a short crew nacelle, with a single engine in the nose of the nacelle, and an open tailboom truss. It was of sesquiplane layout, and used wing warping for lateral control. The wings of the Caudron had scalloped trailing edges that were to become a trademark of the aircraft.

Operational history
Ten Caudron G.2s were produced, with five being assigned to Escadrille Caudron Monoplace 39, four being delivered to the Australian Flying Corps, and one going to the Royal Naval Air Service.

Specifications

See also

References

 
 Kalevi Keskinen, Kyösti Partonen, Kari Stenman: Suomen Ilmavoimat I 1918-27, 2005. .

G.2
1910s French military reconnaissance aircraft
1910s French military trainer aircraft
Sesquiplanes
Single-engined tractor aircraft
Aircraft first flown in 1913
Rotary-engined aircraft